Secret Road Music Services is a boutique music licensing, music publishing, and artist management company in Los Angeles, California. The label's roster includes Ingrid Michaelson.

History
Secret Road was founded in 2007 by Lynn Grossman. Shortly after their formation, they came across Ingrid Michaelson’s MySpace page and asked to sign her. Since signing, Michaelson has had a number of high-profile placements, including, notably, an Old Navy commercial in December 2011 (featuring her first single, "The Way I Am") and Grey’s Anatomy.

Secret Road now represents the songs of over 80 artists including Chance Peña. They clear both the mechanical and synchronization rights for their artists.

In 2011, they launched their Latin division in addition to their publishing division.

Services

Licensing
The licensing division of Secret Road represents over 4,000 songs in a well-rounded selection of genres. The artists that Secret Road pitches on a regular basis represent only a small portion of their overall catalogue. On a daily basis, multiple artists are pitched for various licensing opportunities that include television programs, films, and advertisements. Artists represented by Secret Road have received many notable placements in television shows such as Grey's Anatomy and Pretty Little Liars and with brands such as Old Navy and Cadillac. For a list of notable placements please see Notable Placements. In October 2015, Jerome Spence was hired as VP of Film, Television, Advertising Markets, and Business Development.

Management
Ingrid Michaelson is Secret Road's only management client. Michaelson's career has been cited as an innovative business model for independent artists. Her many placements in film, television, and commercials, online presence, and creative marketing strategies have given the artist much success, without the help of a record label. Michaelson's management team continues to seek out innovative marketing strategies, using brand partnerships and cross promotions with stores like Anthropologie to promote her new record, Human Again.

Publishing

Secret Road began their Publishing division in early 2012. In August, Joshua Sarubin was named head of A&R and Publishing.

Notable placements
Thirteen of Ingrid Michaelson’s songs have been placed in the ABC show Grey’s Anatomy. Of these, the song “Keep Breathing” was included on Volume 3 of the Grey’s Anatomy Original Soundtrack. Her song “The Way I Am” was placed in an Old Navy commercial in 2007.

Placements from other Secret Road artists include the films No Strings Attached and I Love You Phillip Morris as well as the TV shows Pretty Little Liars, Castle, Hawaii Five-0, One Tree Hill, and Prime Suspect.

Commercial placements include brands such as Google, Old Navy, Chase, Crayola, Target, and Cadillac as well as international and worldwide placements for  Rimmel London, Queensland Tourism, and Disney.

Licensing roster past and present

 Act As If
 Adam Agin
 Aidan Hawken
 Allie Moss
 AM
 Amy Stroup
 Andrew Belle
 Apache Relay
 Ashton Allen
 Barcelona
 Ben Rector
 Bess Rogers
 Black Lab
 Brett Dennen
 Brooke Waggoner
 Cary Brothers
 Chance Peña
 The Chapin Sisters
 Citizen Cope
 Civil Twilight
 The Civil Wars
 Daniel Ahearn & The Jones
 The Daylights
 Down Like Silver

 Drew Holcomb & The Neighbors
 Elektrik People
 Elenowen
 Eytan and The Embassy
 Fast Romantics
 Foy Vance
 Garrison Starr
 Gemma Hayes
 Gentlemen Hall
 The Good Luck Joes
 Graffiti6
 Greater California
 Harper Blynn
 Hayley Sales
 Hidden Pony Records
 Hillbilly Herald
 Ingrid Michaelson
 Jeff Kite
 Jeremy Fisher
 Jocelyn Alice
 Josh Ritter
 Jules Larson
 Justin James
 Kat Edmonson

 Katie Herzig
 The Kicks
 Kitty Clementine
 La Santa Cecilia
 Lady Danville
 Lesands
 Lex Land
 Little Children
 Liz Longley
 Location Location
 Los Lonely Boys
 Los Rakas
 Lovemonk Records
 Magnificent Dreams
 Mandy Mann
 Maria Del Pilar aka Pilar Díaz
 Matthew Frankel
 Matthew Mayfield
 Matthew Perryman Jones
 Matthew Ryan
 Neulore
 Oceanship (Brad Lyons)
 One Love
 Orlando

 The Paper Raincoat
 The Parlour Suite
 Peter Bradley Adams
 Putumayo World Music
 Rabbit!
 Rachael Yamagata
 Renee And Jeremy
 Right The Stars
 Riley and the Roxies
 The Rival
 Robbie Wyckoff
 Rose Cousins
 Simon Lynge
 The Smashing Pumpkins
 The Steps
 Sugar & The Hi-Lows
 Tom Jordan
 Trent Dabbs
 Trigger Code
 William Fitzsimmons
 Yael Naim
 Zuzuka Poderosa

Releases
 Ingrid Michaelson - Slow the Rain (Jan 10, 2005)
 Ingrid Michaelson - Girls and Boys (Sep, 2007)
 Ingrid Michaelson - Be OK (Oct 14, 2008)
 Ingrid Michaelson - Everybody (Aug 25, 2009)
 Ingrid Michaelson - Human Again (Jan 24, 2012)

See also
 List of record labels
 Music licensing
 Music publisher
 Ingrid Michaelson

References

External links
 Official site

American independent record labels
Indie rock record labels
Record labels established in 2007